UFC Bonus Awards are three separate cash bonuses usually awarded to four fighters after each UFC event, based on internal decisions by UFC management. More/fewer bonuses have been awarded at some events, especially when no knockouts or submissions occurred.

 Fight of the Night: Awarded to the two fighters who delivered the most impressive fight on the card.
 Knockout of the Night: Awarded to the fighter with the most impressive knockout/technical knockout.
 Submission of the Night: Awarded to the fighter with the most impressive submission.
 Performance of the Night: On February 11, 2014, the UFC announced a modification to its live event bonuses. Since UFC Fight Night 36, UFC has awarded Fight of the Night Bonuses to each of the fighters in the best fight of the night, as well as additional Performance of the Night Bonuses. The Performance of the Night bonuses are awarded to the athletes who put on the best and most exciting individual performances. The Submission of the Night and the Knockout of the Night bonuses have been discontinued and the bonus amounts remained $50,000.

Fighters with the most awards

Male award recipients (with eight or more awards)

Female award recipients (with three or more awards)

Award recipients

1. Fans voted to decide Fight of the Night.
2. Brian Ebersole was awarded an honorary "getting those horrifying shorts off TV as soon as possible" bonus for defeating Dennis Hallman.
3. Pat Healy was disqualified for Fight of the Night and Submission of the Night bonuses due to failing a post-fight drug test.
4. Ryan Benoit received Josh Sampo's Fight of the Night bonus due to Sampo missing weight.
5. Mark Hunt received Antônio Silva's Fight of the Night bonus due to Silva failing a post-fight drug test.
6. Mike King was disqualified for Fight of the Night bonus due to failing a post-fight drug test.
7. Piotr Hallmann was disqualified for Fight of the Night bonus due to failing a post-fight drug test.
8. Rony Jason was disqualified for Performance of the Night bonus due to failing a post-fight drug test.
9. Frank Camacho was disqualified for Fight of the Night bonus due to missing weight.
10. Robert Whittaker received Yoel Romero's Fight of the Night bonus due to Romero missing weight.
11. Jin Soo Son was disqualified for Fight of the Night bonus due to missing weight.
12. Tristan Connelly received Michel Pereira's Fight of the Night bonus due to Pereira missing weight.
13. Abdul Razak Alhassan was disqualified for Fight of the Night bonus due to missing weight, as a result a third Performance of the Night bonus was awarded.
14. Gregor Gillespie received Carlos Diego Ferreira's Fight of the Night bonus due to Ferreira missing weight.
15. Julian Erosa received Steven Peterson's Fight of the Night bonus due to Peterson missing weight.
16. Marlon Vera received Rob Font's Fight of the Night bonus due to Font missing weight.

See also
List of WEC bonus award recipients

References

External links
FightMetric - Official UFC statistics

Bonus award recipients
Lists of mixed martial artists
Lists of sports awards